Iroquois are an indigenous people of North America.

Iroquois may also refer to:

Iroquois people
 Iroquois kinship, a system of familial comprehension that originated with the Iroquois tribes
 Iroquoian languages
 Seven Nations of Canada, another confederation that was referred to as 'the Iroquois Confederacy', unrelated to the popular Iroquois Confederacy

Places

Antarctica
 Iroquois Plateau

Canada
 Iroquois, Ontario
 Iroquois Falls, Ontario

United States
 Iroquois, Illinois
 Iroquois County, Illinois
 Iroquois, Louisville, Kentucky
 Iroquois, South Dakota
 Iroquois, West Virginia
 Iroquois Township (disambiguation)

Geology
 Glacial Lake Iroquois, a prehistoric, proglacial lake in present-day Ontario and New York State

Military 
 UH-1 Iroquois, United States Army utility helicopter nicknamed the "Huey"
 , the name of two Canadian warships
 Orenda Iroquois, a turbojet engine for military use developed by Orenda Aerospace

Other
 Iroquois (di Suvero), an outdoor sculpture in Philadelphia, Pennsylvania, US
 Iroquois (horse) (1878–1899), first American-bred to win the Epsom Derby
 Iroquois Pliskin, also known as Solid Snake, from the Metal Gear series of video games
 Iroquois Theater Fire in Chicago, 1903
 Iroquois River (disambiguation), including Rivière des Iroquois

See also